Assault City is a rail shooter released for the Master System in 1990. Two versions were released: the original, which only supports the directional pad, and a second edition which supports the Light Phaser gun. The two versions are distinguished by a large red light phaser on the cover of the second edition.

Plot
The plot centers around Joe, one of the last of the humans remaining that can overturn the cybernetic revolt. Nothing can stop him from destroying the control system which forces the robots to kill. In the latter half of the 21st century, robots have been engaged in labor in dangerous places, housework, etc. Then suddenly, the control system used to function these robots plotted a revolt against the human race, and ordered every robot to annihilate all of the people. The robots robbed them of their weapons, and occupied various military bases and factories.

The war robots that were manufactured there murdered men, one after another, and the survivors organized a resistance and went into a full-scale offensive against the enemy's army.

Reception
Console XS gave it an 83% score.

References

External links

1990 video games
Europe-exclusive video games
Light gun games
Rail shooters
Sanritsu Denki games
Master System games
Master System-only games
Video games set in the 21st century
Sega video games
Video games about robots
Science fiction video games
Single-player video games
Video games developed in Japan